Usul ash-Shashi (Uṣūl ash-Shāshī) is a text on usul al-fiqh (principles of Islamic jurisprudence) according to the Hanafi madhhab. It is studied as part of the Dars-i Nizami curriculum used in many Islamic seminaries, especially in South Asia. There is a debate over the identity of the work's author.

References

Hanafi literature